Hilla Shamia (Hebrew: הילה שמיע, b. 1983) is an Israeli product designer based in Tel Aviv, Israel. Her works are included in Israel Museum collection as well as in Serge Tiroche collection.

Biography 
Upon graduating her Industrial Design studies at Holon Institute of Technology (HIT) in 2011, Shamia opened an independent design studio carrying out material research and development of forms, whilst drawing tremendous inspiration from the process of time and the supposed imperfections found in nature. Shamia is married to Lior Yamin, an industrial designer and owner of SAGA and Asufa. In Israel, Shamia is represented by SAGA.

Wood Casting 
Shamia's Wood Casting furniture is made using a technique she developed of casting aluminium or brass on natural wood, contrasting the natural elements of wood and metal. It has been featured in major international design magazines such as Wallpaper, Dezeen, Viewpoint, Financial Times, Elle Decor, Architectural Digest and Cosmopolitan, and has been included in design shows including as London Design Week, Milan Design Week, Ambiente, Frankfurt, and Pitti Filati, Florence. Each piece is hand-made and unique due to the various trees used and depending on the "leakage" of the metal through the wood cracks.

Other works 
Alongside the Wood Casting series, the studio also produces wooden pendulum clocks with minimalistic design.  Shamia was working with glass, and published her Cactus series, including sculptures and light fixtures. These are made using a traditional crafted glass-blowing technique, with a comical shape of the cactus intended to give the object lightness and humor. In 2017 Shamia displayed her glass-made interpretation for eyewear at the exhibition 'Overview' at Holon Design Museum.

Collaborations 
In 2015 Shamia collaborated with Ido Garini, the founder of Studio Appétit, and displayed her project 'Or Brulee' at the 'Things of Edible Beauty' exhibition at 2015 Milan Design Week. It was the first time that the Wood Casting technology combined blackened wood with brass.
During her residency at Yeruham Design Terminal, Shamia collaborated with the glass factory Phoenicia, and designed a glass bottle through a disturbance in the factory's 24/7 assembly line.
Later that year, as part of 'Syndicate' exhibition, Shamia collaborated with the illustrator Miki Mottes on their Totem project. Based on Mottes' illustration, Shamia created totem-like objects, made in a traditional glass blowing technique.

Exhibitions

Residencies 

2015 – Yeruham Design Terminal, Yeruham, Israel

Prizes 

2013 – Nominated for the ‘German Design Award 2013’

References

External links 

Product designers
1983 births
Living people